Ashley Zukerman (born 30 December 1983) is an Australian-American actor known for playing Dr. Charlie Isaacs on WGN America's Manhattan, Senior Constable Michael Sandrelli in Australian drama series Rush, and Jesse Banks in the Australian political thriller The Code, for which he received an AACTA Award for Best Lead Actor in a Television Drama in 2014. He also played a recurring role in Succession. In 2021, he portrayed Robert Langdon in the TV series adaptation of Dan Brown's The Lost Symbol.

Early life
Zukerman was born in Santa Monica, California, the son of Ingrid and Moshe Zukerman, and moved to Melbourne with his family when he was two years old. His family is Jewish; his father is from Israel and his mother is from Peru. His parents spoke Hebrew during his childhood. He is the older brother of Science Vs. podcaster Wendy Zukerman. Zukerman attended Wesley College at the Glen Waverley campus and began a degree in Science and Engineering at Monash University before being accepted into the Victorian College of the Arts.

Career
Graduating from the VCA in 2006, he began his professional career in the theatre. He had a critically acclaimed role in The History Boys, directed by Peter Evans for the Melbourne Theatre Company. He then appeared in HBO's war miniseries The Pacific, which premiered 14 March 2010 and also in Lowdown created by Adam Zwar and Amanda Brotchie. His Australian break came when he played Constable Michael Sandrelli on the series Rush for which he was nominated for a Logie award in the Most Outstanding New Talent category. In 2011, after his time on Rush, Zukerman joined the cast of the short-lived Steven Spielberg–produced sci-fi television series Terra Nova.

Zukerman then returned to the theatre working with director Eamon Flack at the Belvoir Theatre Company in As You Like It playing Orlando, and then two years later in Angels in America playing Joe Pitt. Angels in America won Best Play at the 2014 Helpmann Awards.

He played socially dysfunctional genius hacker Jesse Banks opposite Dan Spielman in the Australian political thriller The Code created by Shelley Birse. The show received huge national and international acclaim and 10 AACTA Award nominations, out of which it won six including Best Lead Actor in a Television Drama for Zukerman.

Early in 2014, Zukerman won the role of ambitious wunderkind Dr. Charlie Isaacs in the WGN America original drama Manhattan created by filmmaker Sam Shaw and directed by Thomas Schlamme. In 2016, Zukerman was cast in the recurring role of Peter MacLeish on the ABC political drama series Designated Survivor, which premiered in the autumn of the same year.

In 2018, Zukerman had a recurring role on the HBO series Succession, and in 2020, appeared as the title character's husband on the Hulu miniseries A Teacher. In 2021, he stars in the Fear Street horror trilogy that streams on Netflix, beginning with Fear Street Part One: 1994. It was announced in March 2020 that Zukerman has also been cast to portray Robert Langdon in the NBC drama pilot Langdon, which is based on Dan Brown's 2009 thriller novel The Lost Symbol.

Filmography

Film

Television

Theatre
As You Like It (2011) – Orlando
This Is Our Youth (2009) – Warren
B.C. (2009) – Joseph
The Hypocrite (2008) – Valére
The History Boys (2007) – Timms

Accolades

References

External links
 

1983 births
21st-century American male actors
21st-century Australian male actors
AACTA Award winners
American emigrants to Australia
Australian male television actors
American people of Israeli descent
American people of Peruvian descent
Australian people of Israeli descent
Australian people of Peruvian descent
Hispanic and Latino American male actors
Jewish American male actors
Jewish Australian male actors
Living people
Male actors from Melbourne
Male actors from Santa Monica, California
People educated at Wesley College (Victoria)
University of Melbourne alumni
21st-century American Jews